La Salle: Expedition II was a 1976 tricentennial reenactment of La Salle's original expedition. French teacher Reid Henri Lewis initiated the project, recruiting sixteen Elgin Larkin High School students and seven adults for the 3300 mile journey.

Preparation 
Preparation for this trip began in 1974. Reid Henri Lewis had searched out the correct replicas of canoes of the time which were eventually made by canoe historian Ralph Frese of Chicago.  Funding was a major component in this reenactment, along with recreating the clothing to be historically accurate.  They also had to ensure they would have the essential supplies for such a journey.

History 
 

The seventeenth century expedition of La Salle was a series of explorations of the Mississippi river starting from the Illinois river tributary to the Gulf of Mexico. It was conducted by  René Robert Cavelier, Sieur de La Salle in 1679 through 1682.

See also 
Hog Island (Wisconsin) § La Salle: Expedition II

Further reading 
There have been two books written about La Salle Expedition II:
The Last Voyageurs by Lorraine Boissoneault
Hard Rivers: The Untold Saga of La Salle: Expedition II by Craig P. Howard

References 

Expeditions from the United States
Historical reenactment